Ivan Sergeyevich Khokhlov (28 May 1895 – 11 February 1973) was a Soviet-Russian statesman who was from 1940 to 1943 the Chairman of the Council of People's Commissars of the Russian SFSR, literally meaning Premier or Prime Minister.

From 1906 he worked as a weaver. Entering the Red Army in 1918, he was an employee of the Rabkrin in 1920–23. To 1929 Khokhlov was a member of executive committees of Bronnitsky Uyezd and then Bogorodsky Uyezd. In 1931–34 in the financial department of Moscow Oblast, 1934–37 — chairman of the Ramensky District executive committee.

Khokhlov was elected member of the 1st, 2nd, 3rd and 4th Supreme Soviet of the USSR (1937–58), from 17 January 1938 to 31 May 1938 he was deputy chairman of the Presidium. From 2 June 1940 to 23 June 1943, he was the chairman of the Council of People's Commissars of the RSFSR. Due to the prolonged absence of Khokhlov, from 5 May 1942 his deputy Konstantin Pamfilov was the acting chairman of the Council of People's Commissars. Khokhlov's absence in Moscow was caused by his membership in the Military Council of Western Front. The main concern of Khokhlov at this time was the transportation of troops, the army's provision with military equipment, weapons, ammunition, fuel, evacuation from the western and southwestern regions, and repair of military equipment.

From 1955 he was the head of the Main Directorate for Trade Inspection of the Ministry of Trade of the USSR. Ivan Khokhlov died in Moscow on 11 February 1973 and was buried at Novodevichy Cemetery.

References

1895 births
1973 deaths
Politicians from Moscow
Central Committee of the Communist Party of the Soviet Union candidate members
Members of the Supreme Soviet of the Soviet Union
Russian communists
Heads of government of the Russian Soviet Federative Socialist Republic
Burials at Novodevichy Cemetery